The Austen (from "Australian Sten") was a 9×19mm Australian submachine gun derived from the British Sten gun developed during the Second World War. In total 19,914 Austens were produced during the war by Diecasters Ltd of Melbourne and W. T. Carmichael Ltd of Sydney.

Design and development 
With the war in Europe demanding most of the available materiel for the British, Australia was not in a position to purchase weapons from the United Kingdom or the United States, and so they had to develop their own submachine guns. The British Sten submachine gun was taken as the basis for the Austen. The barrel, body (receiver) and trigger mechanism of the Mark II Sten were copied, while the folding stock and bolt, with separate firing pin and telescopic cover over the return spring, were copied from the German MP40. The folding stock also included a screwdriver and a cleaning rod which both unscrewed from the tubes of the stock. The weapon also featured twin pistol-style grips; the latter containing a small spare parts container inside. The weapon had a selective-fire feature permitting the firer to fire single shots or fully automatic at 500 rounds per minute.

An interesting production feature of the Austen was that some parts were manufactured by the diecasting process. These parts were the magazine housing, part of the mechanism for the stock and the forward half of the magazine. The magazine loader was also diecast. The two firms manufacturing the Austen were specialist diecasting companies.

There was a suppressed version made for use by Z Special Force.

An improved version, the Mark II Austen, was introduced but was not ready until 1946, after the end of the Second World War. This model made even more extensive use of diecasting; the large grip assemblies at both the front and back of the gun were produced in this way. 200 examples were built, and these were both adopted and declared obsolete in August 1946.

The Austen never achieved the level of popularity that the Owen gun achieved. This was largely because the Owen was a very reliable weapon and although the Austen was an improvement on the basic Sten, it was never able to achieve the Owen's reliability. 

Regarded as obsolete by 1945, the Austen was rarely used in subsequent decades. In contrast, the Owen was widely used by the Australian Army until the 1960s.

Notes

References

 Skennerton, Ian. (1994). Small Arms Identification: 9mm Austen MkI and 9mm Owen MkI Sub-Machine Guns - Parts Identification and Lists, S.M.G.Series Notes, Exploded Parts Drawings, Descriptions, Accessories and Fittings. Published by  Ian D Skennerton.  
 McNab, Chris. (2001). Twentieth-Century Small Arms. Grange Books. .

External links
 Special Operations Australia Australian SMGs
 Special Operations Australia Special Purpose SMGs
 Allied Weapons of WW2
 Jungle camo spray-painted Austen

9mm Parabellum submachine guns
World War II infantry weapons of Australia
World War II submachine guns